The  is a municipal zoo that opened in July 1967 in Asahikawa, Hokkaidō, Japan, and is the northernmost zoo in the country. In August 2004, over 320,000 people had visited the zoo, the second highest number of visitors among all the zoos in Japan. Located in Higashi Asahikawa, on the outskirts of Asahikawa, the Asahiyama Zoo is accredited by the Japanese Association of Zoos and Aquariums (JAZA).

History

The Maruyama Zoo in Sapporo, and the Obihiro Zoo predate the construction of the Asahiyama Zoo. In 1964, the mayor at the time, Kōzō Igarashi, budgeted for the Asahiyama Zoo project, and chose Mount Asahi as the building site due to its geology and traffic convenience. Construction of the Asahiyama Zoo began in April 1966, and was completed in June 1967, at a total expense of 250 million yen. The zoo was inaugurated on July 1, 1967, with 75 species of animals including 200 common carp. Driven by a decline in visitors, the park erected a steel roller coaster which was dismantled in 2006.

As the population of Asahikawa has increased, the number of visitors rose to a peak of 597,000 in 1983. In 1994, when a western lowland gorilla and a ring-tailed lemur in the zoo died of an echinococcus infection, the zoo was closed before the regular season to prevent the disease from spreading. This resulted in a decline in the number of visitors.

Since 1997, the zoo has undertaken the construction of unique interactive animal viewing facilities, initiated by chief manager Masao Kosuge. After "Totori no Mura" (Totori's Village), which enables visitors to see birds flying freely in a huge cage, the zoo continued to install new facilities including Polar Bear Aquatic Park, a "walk- through" penguin aquarium, an orangutan trapeze, and a seal aquarium which includes a vertical tube through which the seals can swim.

In August 2004, the monthly number of visitors exceeded 320,000, which surpassed Ueno Zoo in Tokyo. In 2006, the annual number of visitors reached 2 million, and the following year, the number was 3 million, which was surpassed only by the Ueno Zoo (about 3.5 million people in the same year). Over the years, the Asahiyama Zoo has drawn a number of media attractions, and some TV programs and publications featuring the zoo's success have also been created.

Attractions and Animals

Polar bear house 
Animals:

 Polar bear

Seal house 
Animals:

 Spotted seal
 Steller's sea eagle

Penguin house 
Animals:

 Gentoo penguin 
 Humboldt penguin
 King penguin
 Rockhopper penguin

Fierce animal house 
Animals:

 African lion
 Amur leopard
 Amur tiger
 Snow leopard

Forests of wolves and yezo sika deer 
Animals:

 Timberwolf
 Yezo sika deer

Chimpanzee forest 
Animals:

 Chimpanzee

Spider monkey and capybara house 
Animals:

 Geoffroy's spider monkey
 Capybara

Giraffe and hippo house 
Animals:

 Common ostrich
 Crested porcupine
 Great white pelican
 Hippopotamus
 Reticulated giraffe

Gibbon house 
Animals:

 Lar gibbon
 Reeves's muntjac

Snow monkey mountain 
Animals:

 Japanese macaque
 Japanese wild boar

Flying bird and flamingo house 
Animals:

 American flamingo
 Bar-headed goose
 Black swan
 Chilean flamingo
 Greater flamingo
 Spot-billed duck
 Wild duck
 Whooper swan

Orangutan house 
Animals:

 Amboina box turtle
 Bornean orangutan

Hokkaido animals 
Animals:

 Eurasian eagle-owl
 Hokkaido Ural Owl
 Mandarin duck
 Hokkaido fox
 White-tailed eagle
 Yezo tanuki

Yezo brown bear house 
Animals:

 Yezo brown bear

Notable species

 Arctic fox
 Blakiston's fish owl
 Eastern black-and-white colobus
 Pallas's cat
 Red-crowned crane
 Red panda
 Reindeer
 Ring-tailed lemur
 Snowy owl

Notes

References
 Kenji, Furutachi, 旭山動物園物語 (Story of Asahiyama Zoo), Juritsu-Sha, 2005, 
 Masao, Kosuge, 「旭山動物園」革命 ("Asahiyama Zoo" Revolution), Kadokawa Shoten, 2006,

External links
  
 JR Hokkaido Asahiyama Zoo Train Page 

Tourist attractions in Hokkaido
Zoos in Japan
Buildings and structures in Asahikawa
1967 establishments in Japan
Zoos established in 1967